Chryseobacterium psychrotolerans  is a gram-negative, non-spore-forming and non-motile bacteria from the genus of Chryseobacterium which has been isolated from the permafrost of the Tianshan Mountains.

References 

psychrotolerans
Bacteria described in 2015